, known in PAL regions as A.O.T. 2, is an action hack and slash video game based on Hajime Isayama's manga series of the same name released for Nintendo Switch, PlayStation 4, PlayStation Vita, Windows, Xbox One, and Stadia.

Plot
The game covers the plot of the first 50 chapters of Attack on Titan (also covered by the first two seasons of the anime adaptation), allowing the player to create an original character and interact with the characters of the manga.

The last mission of the base game has an original ending, separate from both the anime and manga.

The DLC "Final Battle" covers chapters 51 to 90 of the manga (also covered by the third season of the anime).

Gameplay
The game features cel-shaded graphics and features the player defeating the titans in large, open areas. Key new features over the first title include a story-mode that's entirely playable in co-op, as well as a character creator.

Development
Developed by Omega Force and published by Koei Tecmo, development launched shortly after completion of the first title. In an interview with Polygon, producer Hisashi Koinuma and Omega Force CEO Hideo Suzuki mentioned that a key focus was on making the AI more intelligent, as well as making the game more difficult in comparison to the first title. They've also worked closely with the manga's publisher Kodansha and writer Hajime Isayama in the creation of additional elements to the story. Initially the English voice cast were going to record dialogue but this was not realised due to time constraints, very much like the first game. A demo of the game was released in Japan on April 26, 2019 and worldwide on May 7, 2019 and it was distributed til July 31, 2019. The DLC "The Final Battle" was released on July 4, 2019 in Japan and on July 5 in North America and Europe.

Reception

Attack on Titan 2 sold 28,480 copies on PlayStation 4 within its first week on sale in Japan, which placed it at number three on the all format sales chart. The Nintendo Switch version sold 22,941 in the same week, whilst the PlayStation Vita version sold 15,621 copies.

The game was nominated for "Sound Editing in a Game Cinema" at the National Academy of Video Game Trade Reviewers Awards.

References

External links

2018 video games
Action video games
Beat 'em ups
Hack and slash games
Multiplayer and single-player video games
Nintendo Switch games
PlayStation 3 games
PlayStation 4 games
PlayStation Vita games
Koei Tecmo games
Video games based on anime and manga
Video games developed in Japan
Windows games
Xbox One games
Stadia games
Attack on Titan
Omega Force games